Sainte-Pélagie was a prison in Paris, in active use from 1790 to 1899. It was founded earlier than that, however, in 1662, as place for "repentant girls" and later "debauched women and girls." The former Parisian prison was located between the current group of buildings bearing No. 56 Rue de la Clef with Rue du Puits-de-l'Ermite in the 5th arrondissement of Paris at the old Place Sainte-Pélagie.

The penal structure held many noted prisoners during the French Revolution, with Madame Roland, Grace Dalrymple Elliott and Marie-Louise O'Murphy being among the known prisoners. After the revolution, the Marquis de Sade was imprisoned here, as was the young mathematician Évariste Galois. During the July Monarchy, the "April insurgees" were also detained there, and some managed to escape through a tunnel. The painter Gustave Courbet was also imprisoned here for his activities in the Paris Commune. He painted a self-portrait titled, Gustave Courbet: Self-Portrait at Sainte-Pélagie.

See also
Bagne of Toulon
Grand Châtelet
La Force Prison
Timeline of the French Revolution

References

External links 
 
 
 

Defunct prisons in Paris
Buildings and structures demolished in 1899